Udhayliyah Airport is a small airport located in the village of Udhayliyah, 150 km southwest of Dammam in the Eastern Province of Saudi Arabia. It occupies a small area of 0.55 km2 east of the residential camp.

Overview
Saudi Aramco, the national oil company in Saudi Arabia, owns the airfield and was being operated for domestic General Aviation used by the company for logistics. However, the company realized the opportunity of the utilization of the nearby airport in Hofuf which resulted in the local airport in Udhayliyah to become unused at the present time except for special flights by company executives.

The airport has one runway that is 2,185 meters long and 30 meters wide. Two parking/gates are available for medium-sized airplanes. Parking lot is located just outside the terminal.

References

Airports in Saudi Arabia
Saudi Aramco